Allsvenskan (literally, "The National League") is the second tier in the league system of Speedway in Sweden and currently comprises six motorcycle speedway teams. 

Until the introduction of the Elitserien in 1982 the Allsvenskan was the highest level of Swedish Speedway.

Past winners

2022 Clubs

History 

From the start of Swedish league speedway in 1948 until 1981 the Allsvenskan was the top speedway league in Sweden. But in 1982 the Elitserien was formed and the Allsvenskan became the second level of Swedish speedway. Speedway meetings in Sweden are normally held between May and September. The teams are generally known by nicknames rather than club or city names. These nicknames usually have some sort of local connection.

Rules 
As with the Elitserien and the Speedway Elite League in the UK, the top four teams at the end of each season compete in the playoffs in semi-finals and a final. The winner of the final are crowned the champions and are often promoted to the Elitserien, although teams sometimes decline that opportunity.

Team Selection
Unlike in British speedway the Swedish leagues have a squad from which the choose 7 riders for each meeting. The two riders with the lowest consecutive match average must be placed as reserves in jackets number 6 and 7.

See also 
 motorcycle speedway
 Swedish Speedway Team Championship

References

Speedway leagues
Speedway competitions in Sweden
Professional sports leagues in Sweden